is a video game production company headquartered in Shinagawa, Tokyo, Japan. It was founded on August 14, 1985 by former Namco employee Masanobu Endō, who continued to develop projects for Namco through his company. The company later made a subsidiary company called , while the goodwill was transferred.

Notable works

Arcades

 Hopping Mappy
 The Return of Ishtar

GBC
 DT: Lords of Genomes

NES
 Family Circuit
 Family Circuit '91
 Itadaki Street: Watashi no Omise ni Yottette
 Kidō Senshi Z-Gundam: Hot Scramble
 Kai no Bōken: The Quest of Ki
 Tenkaichi Bushi Keru Nagūru
 Wizardry: Proving Grounds of the Mad Overlord
 Wizardry: Knight of Diamonds

Nintendo DS
 Ōkamiden

Turbografx-16
 Tower of Druaga (original arcade and Famicom versions were developed by Namco.)
 World Circuit

Super NES
 The Blue Crystal Rod
 Super Family Circuit
 Wizardry V''''
 Wizardry VISega Saturn
 Airs Adventure''

External links
 Official Game Studio website
 MobyGames profile

Software companies based in Tokyo
Video game companies of Japan
Video game companies established in 1985
Japanese companies established in 1985